The Josep Trueta University Hospital (Catalan: Hospital Universitari de Girona Doctor Josep Trueta, Spanish: Hospital Universitario Doctor Josep Trueta) is a public hospital in the city of Girona in Catalonia. It was opened on 13 April 1956 in honour of the Catalan surgeon Dr Josep Trueta. The hospital has several departments, but most notably an emergency department, an ICU with almost 100 beds and its own oncology wing.

The hospital is managed by the Catalan public health authority, .

History 
The hospital began construction six years before opening in 1956. The hospital has since been renovated several times and three additional buildings have been added to the complex. When created, the Hospital remained managed by the Spanish Health Authority under the rule of the Franco dictatorship of Spain. After the transition of power from the Spanish government to the Catalan government, the hospital officially changed its language and name to Catalan and became a teaching hospital with its own School of Medicine and residentship program.

Departments and specialties 

 Allergy Treatment
 Anesthetics and Resuscitation
 Blood and Tissue Bank
 Cardiac Surgery
 Cardiology
 Care continuity unit
 Clinical Laboratory
 Clinical Hematology
 Dermatology
 Digestology
 Emergency Medicine
 Endocrinology
 General and Digestive Surgery
 Hospital pharmacy
 Intensive Care Medicine
 Internal Medicine and Infectious Diseases
 Maxillofacial surgery
 Medical Oncology (ICO)
 Medical Physics and Radiological Protection
 Nephrology
 Neurology
 Neurophysiology
 Neurosurgery
 Obstetrics and Gynecology
 Ophthalmology
 Orthopedic and Traumatological Surgery
 Otorhinolaryngology
 Pathological Anatomy
 Pediatric Surgery
 Pediatrics
 Plastic Surgery
 Pulmonology
 Radiology
 Radiotherapy Oncology (ICO)
 Rehabilitation
 Rheumatology
 Thoracic Surgery
 Urology
 Vascular Surgery

References 

Girona
Hospitals in Catalonia
Hospitals in Spain
Teaching hospitals in Spain
Hospitals established in 1956
Buildings and structures in Girona
Buildings and structures in the Province of Girona